You're In My Heart is the third EP released by the melodic hard rock band Ten. The compact disc was officially released only in Asian markets.

Track listing
All songs written by Gary Hughes except where noted.
 "You're In My Heart" (EP version) – 5:33
 "If Only For A Day" – 8:13
 "Black Moon Rising" – 4:06
 "To Die For" – 4:34 (Hughes/Vinny Burns)
 "You're In My Heart" (Karaoke version) – 5:32

All tracks were previously unreleased.
Tracks 1 and 5, original version on the album The Robe.

Personnel
Gary Hughes – vocals
Vinny Burns – Lead guitars
John Halliwell – Rhythm guitars
Ged Rylands – keyboards
Greg Morgan – drums

Production
Mixing – Mike Stone
Engineer – Ray Brophy
Drums recorded by Mike Stone

External links
 https://web.archive.org/web/20010430233542/http://www.usiwakamaru.or.jp/~oct-23/page/tencd.html

Ten (band) albums
1997 EPs
Albums produced by Gary Hughes